Pavel Bittner (born 29 October 2002) is a Czech cyclist, who currently rides for UCI WorldTeam .

Major results

2019
 National Junior Road Championships
1st  Road race
2nd Time trial
 7th Overall Saarland Trofeo
1st Stages 3a & 4
2020
 National Junior Road Championships
1st  Road race
2nd Time trial
 UEC European Junior Road Championships
2nd  Road race
7th Time trial
2021
 1st Stage 1 Course de la Paix Grand Prix Jeseníky
 3rd Overall Orlen Nations Grand Prix
2022
 5th Road race, National Under-23 Road Championships
 5th Ronde van Overijssel
 6th Road race, UCI Road World Under-23 Championships
 8th Road race, UEC European Under-23 Road Championships
 9th Rund um Köln

References

External links

2002 births
Living people
Czech male cyclists
Sportspeople from Olomouc